The Dragon was an event on the 2008 Vintage Yachting Games program at the IJsselmeer,  Netherlands. Six out of the seven scheduled race were completed. 36 sailors, on 12 boats, from 10 nations entered.

Venue overview

Race area and Course
Approximately 2 nautical miles of the coast of Medemblik two course areas (orange and yellow) were used for the 2008 edition of the Vintage Yachting Games.

For the 2008 edition of the Vintage Yachting Games four different courses were available. The Dragon could use only course 4.

Wind conditions 
During the 2008 Vintage Yachting Games the sailors experienced the following weather conditions:

Races

Summary 
In the Dragon at race area Yellow only six races could be completed.

Close competition in the Dragon for the first three positions. Specially when the team of Gordon Ingate, Keith Musto and David Giles (AUS) turned out to be heavy weight specialist on the second day with two wins. The last two races were dominated by the Dutch team of Reinier Wissenraet, Gijs Evers en Marc Reijnhoudt wo took the gold in at the end. The Australians dropped back to third due to the consistent sailing of the British team of Gavia Wilkinson-Cox, Ron Rosenberg and Jon Mortimer who took the silver.

Results 

 dnc = did not compete
 dns = did not start
 dnf = did not finish
 dsq = disqualified
 ocs = on course side
 ret = retired after finish
 Crossed out results did not count for the total result.

Daily standings

Victors

References 

 

Dragon